The Río Paso Hondo is a river in southern Guatemala. Its sources are located on the slopes of the Tecuamburro. From there it flows in a southerly direction to the Pacific Ocean.

References

Rivers of Guatemala